In mathematics, a Ree group is a group of Lie type over a finite field constructed by  from an exceptional automorphism of a Dynkin diagram that reverses the direction of the multiple bonds, generalizing the Suzuki groups found by Suzuki using a different method. They were the last of the infinite families of finite simple groups to be discovered.

Unlike the Steinberg groups, the Ree groups are not given by the points of a connected reductive algebraic group defined over a finite field; in other words, there is no "Ree algebraic group" related to the Ree groups in the same way that (say) unitary groups are related to Steinberg groups. However, there are some exotic pseudo-reductive algebraic groups over non-perfect fields whose construction is related to the construction of Ree groups, as they use the same exotic automorphisms of Dynkin diagrams that change root lengths.

 defined  Ree groups over infinite fields of characteristics 2 and 3.  and  introduced Ree groups of infinite-dimensional Kac–Moody algebras.

Construction

These groups have the following automorphisms:
Any endomorphism  of the field  induces an endomorphism  of the group 
Any automorphism  of the Dynkin diagram induces an automorphism  of the group .

The Steinberg and Chevalley groups can be constructed as fixed points of an endomorphism of X(F) for  the algebraic closure of a field.

Roughly speaking, this endomorphism  comes from the order 2 automorphism of the Dynkin diagram where one ignores the lengths of the roots.

Suppose that the field  has an endomorphism  whose square is the Frobenius endomorphism: . Then the Ree group is defined to be the group of elements  of  such that .

In the case when  is a finite field of order  (with p = 2 or 3) there is an endomorphism with square the Frobenius exactly when k = 2n + 1 is odd, in which case it is unique. So this gives the finite Ree groups as subgroups of B2(22n+1), F4(22n+1), and G2(32n+1) fixed by an involution.

Chevalley groups, Steinberg group, and Ree groups

The relation between Chevalley groups, Steinberg group, and Ree groups is roughly as follows. Given a Dynkin diagram X, Chevalley constructed a group scheme over the integers  whose values over finite fields are the Chevalley groups. The three cases are as follows:
For Chevalley groups,  for some positive integer n. In this case the group of fixed points is also the group of points of X defined over a finite field. 
For Steinberg groups,  for some positive integers m, n with m dividing n and m > 1. In this case the group of fixed points is also the group of points of a twisted (quasisplit) form of X defined over a finite field. 
For Ree groups,  for some positive integers m, n with m not dividing n. In practice m=2 and n is odd. Ree groups are not given as the points of some connected algebraic group with values in a field. they are the fixed points of an order m=2 automorphism of a group defined over a field of order  with n odd, and there is no corresponding field of order pn/2 (although some authors like to pretend there is in their notation for the groups).

Ree groups of type 2B2

The Ree groups of type 2B2 were first found by  using a different method, and are usually called Suzuki groups. Ree realized that a similar construction could be applied to the Dynkin diagrams F4 and G2, leading to two new families of finite simple groups.

Ree groups of type 2G2

The Ree group has order  where q = 32n+1

The Schur multiplier is trivial for n ≥ 1 and for 2G2(3)′.

The outer automorphism group is cyclic of order 2n + 1.

The Ree group is also occasionally denoted by Ree(q), R(q), or E2*(q)

The Ree group 2G2(q) has a doubly transitive permutation representation on  points, and more precisely acts as automorphisms of an S(2, q+1, q3+1) Steiner system. It also acts on a 7-dimensional vector space over the field with q elements as it is a subgroup of G2(q).

The 2-sylow subgroups of the Ree groups are elementary abelian of order 8. Walter's theorem shows that the only other non-abelian finite simple groups with abelian Sylow 2-subgroups are the projective special linear groups in dimension 2 and the Janko group J1. These groups also played a role in the discovery of the first modern sporadic group. They have involution centralizers of the form , and by investigating groups with an involution centralizer of the similar form  Janko found the sporadic group J1.  determined their maximal subgroups.

The Ree groups of type 2G2 are exceptionally hard to characterize.  studied this problem, and was able to show that the structure of such a group is determined by a certain automorphism  of a finite field of characteristic 3, and that if the square of this automorphism is the Frobenius automorphism then the group is the Ree group. He also gave some complicated conditions satisfied by the automorphism . Finally  used elimination theory to show  that Thompson's conditions implied that  in all but 178 small cases, that were eliminated using a computer by Odlyzko and Hunt.

Ree groups of type 2F4

They are simple except for the first one , which  showed has a simple subgroup of index 2, now known as the Tits group. 
 gave a simplified construction of the Ree groups as the symmetries of a 26-dimensional space over the field of order 22n+1 preserving a quadratic form, a cubic form, and a partial multiplication.

The Ree group  has order
q12(q6 + 1)
(q4 − 1)
(q3 + 1)
(q − 1)
where
q = 22n+1.
The Schur multiplier is trivial.
The outer automorphism group is cyclic of order 2n + 1.

These Ree groups have the unusual property that the Coxeter group of their BN pair is not crystallographic: it is the dihedral group of order 16.  showed that all Moufang octagons come from Ree groups of type .

See also

List of finite simple groups

References

External links
ATLAS: Ree group R(27)

Finite groups